Jerry Faye Hall (born July 2, 1956) is an American model and actress. She began modelling in the 1970s and became one of the most sought after models in the world. She transitioned into acting, appearing in the 1989 film Batman. Hall was the long-term partner of Rolling Stones frontman Mick Jagger, with whom she has four children. She subsequently married media mogul Rupert Murdoch until they divorced in 2022.

Early life
Hall was born in Gonzales, Texas, to Marjorie (née Sheffield), a medical records librarian, and John P. Hall. She is of English, Irish, and Dutch descent. She was raised in the Dallas suburb of Mesquite, Texas.

Hall graduated from North Mesquite High School early at 16. While in high school, she also took classes at Eastfield College in archery, tennis, and gymnastics. Hall has been fluent in French since she was 16.

She has a twin sister, Terry, whose jobs have included working in a photography and printmaking shop, real estate investing, and real estate broker. They have three older sisters, including Rosy Hall, one of the first Dallas Cowboys Cheerleaders.

In the TV series Who Do You Think You Are?, Hall discovered that she was descended from Humphrey Best, an associate of American pioneer Daniel Boone.

Career

Modeling
Jerry Hall and her twin sister Terry were in the French Riviera sunbathing on a Saint Tropez beach when fashion agent Claude Haddad discovered them. She moved to Paris where she shared an apartment with singer Grace Jones and Jessica Lange. Her modelling career began when she appeared, in the guise of a siren, on the cover of Roxy Music's album Siren (1975).

By 1977, Hall had been on 40 magazine covers including Italian Vogue and Cosmopolitan. She was earning modelling fees in excess of $1,000 per day. Her long blonde hair and height of six feet quickly made her one of the most visible and photographed models of the day.

In 2016, Hall won the Lifetime Achievement Award from the Fashion Group International Dallas.

Hall was also a muse for artists Francesco Clemente, Ed Ruscha and Lucian Freud. Hall modeled for Andy Warhol many times.

Acting

Hall acted in Urban Cowboy (1980) and director Tim Burton's Batman (1989).

She costarred in an NBC pilot, She's With Me, opposite Dinah Manoff, and penned by Married... With Children creators Ron Leavitt and Michael G. Moye. The unsold pilot aired July 20, 1986. 

She made her professional stage debut playing Cherie in a revival of Bus Stop (a role played by Marilyn Monroe in the film adaption) in the Theaterfest summer stock (hosted at Montclair State University) in July 1988.  She reprised the role for her London West End stage début in 1990 at the Lyric Theatre in Shaftesbury Avenue.

In 1990, she joined many other guests for Roger Waters' massive performance of The Wall in Berlin.

She featured in commercials for Bovril.

Hall played the role of Miss Scarlett in the 1993 British television show Cluedo and in TV series, The Detectives. In the early 2000s, she appeared as Mrs. Robinson in a Broadway production of The Graduate. Hall appeared as herself in the documentary Being Mick (2001). She appeared in Brighton in the play Picasso's Women in 2002.

Hall was presented with the Guinness World Record in February 2004 for making the most musical appearances in a single night; she performed in six shows before 9,124 theatregoers in London's West End.

In 2005, Hall appeared on the West End stage playing Mother Lord in the first London production of Cole Porter's High Society. Hall provided the voice for Sister Penelope in the British cartoon Popetown first screened in New Zealand during the year. In 2007, Hall guest-starred on the British TV show Hotel Babylon. She has also appeared in the BBC comedy series French and Saunders.

In June 2012, Hall made a one-week appearance with David Soul at the Gaiety Theatre, Dublin, in a reprise of the Pulitzer Prize-nominated play Love Letters by A. R. Gurney. On September 10, 2012, Hall was announced as a contestant for the tenth series of the British dance show Strictly Come Dancing. Her professional partner was Anton du Beke. She was the second celebrity to be eliminated from the competition.

Her autobiography, Jerry Hall: My Life in Pictures, was published in 2010.

Other ventures

In 2000, Hall was a judge for the Whitbread Prize. She argued for Seamus Heaney's translation of Beowulf.

In 2005, Hall was at the center of Kept, a reality show based on her search for a kept man.

In 2010, she sold her art collection through Sotheby's. Four years later, she performed at Glastonbury. She wrote music and lyrics to original country and western music.

Personal life

Hall started dating musician Bryan Ferry in 1975, leaving him for Mick Jagger in 1977. Jagger and Hall held a Hindu wedding ceremony on November 21, 1990, in Bali, Indonesia. The putative marriage was later declared null and void ab initio by the High Court of England and Wales in 1999, ruling that the "marriage" was not legally valid according to either Indonesian or English law. The couple have four children together: Elizabeth Scarlett (born 1984), James Leroy (born 1985), Georgia May (born 1992), and Gabriel Luke (born 1997). The couple lived together at Downe House, Richmond Hill, in Greater London, which Jagger purchased in the early 1990s. They separated in August 1999.

On March 4, 2016, Hall married media business magnate Rupert Murdoch, in a ceremony at the Church of England church of St Bride's, Fleet Street, eight weeks after announcing their engagement with a listing in Murdoch's The Times newspaper. On June 22, 2022, The New York Times, citing two anonymous sources, reported that the couple were divorcing. Hall filed for divorce on July 1, 2022 citing irreconcilable differences; the divorce was finalized in August 2022.

References

Further reading

External links

1956 births
Living people
Alumni of the Open University
American autobiographers
American expatriates in England
American film actresses
American people of Dutch descent
American people of English descent
American people of Irish descent
American stage actresses
Female models from Texas
People from Gonzales, Texas
People from Mesquite, Texas
Twin models
American twins
Women autobiographers
21st-century American women
Murdoch family